A field-reversed configuration (FRC) is a type of plasma device studied as a means of producing nuclear fusion. It confines a plasma on closed magnetic field lines without a central penetration. In an FRC, the plasma has the form of a self-stable torus, similar to a smoke ring.

FRCs are closely related to another self-stable magnetic confinement fusion device, the spheromak. Both are considered part of the compact toroid class of fusion devices. FRCs normally have a plasma that is more elongated than spheromaks, having the overall shape of a hollowed out sausage rather than the roughly spherical spheromak.

FRCs were a major area of research in the 1960s and into the 1970s, but had problems scaling up into practical fusion triple products.

History
The FRC was first observed in laboratories in the late 1950s during theta pinch experiments with a reversed background magnetic field. 

The first studies were at the United States Naval Research Laboratory (NRL) in the 1960s. Considerable data were collected, with over 600 published papers. Almost all research was conducted during Project Sherwood at Los Alamos National Laboratory (LANL) from 1975 to 1990, and during 18 years at the Redmond Plasma Physics Laboratory of the University of Washington, with the large s experiment (LSX). 

Later research was at the Air Force Research Laboratory (AFRL), the Fusion Technology Institute (FTI) of the University of Wisconsin-Madison, Princeton Plasma Physics Laboratory, and the University of California, Irvine. 

Private companies now study FRCs for electricity generation, including General Fusion, TAE Technologies, and Helion Energy.

The Electrodeless Lorentz Force Thruster (ELF) developed by MSNW was an attempt to design a space propulsion device. ELF was a candidate in NASA's NextSTEP advanced electric propulsion program, along with the X-3 Nested-Channel Hall Thruster and VASIMR before MSNW dissolved.

Applications 
The primary application is for fusion power generation.

The FRC is also considered for deep space exploration, not only as a possible nuclear energy source, but as means of accelerating a propellant to high levels of specific impulse (Isp) for electrically powered spaceships and fusion rockets, with interest expressed by NASA.

Comparisons

Producing fusion power by confining the plasma with magnetic fields is most effective if the field lines do not penetrate solid surfaces but close on themselves into circles or toroidal surfaces. The mainline confinement concepts of tokamak and stellarator do this in a toroidal chamber, which allows a great deal of control over the magnetic configuration, but requires a very complex construction. The field-reversed configuration offers an alternative in that the field lines are closed, providing good confinement, but the chamber is cylindrical, allowing simpler, easier construction and maintenance.

Field-reversed configurations and spheromaks are together known as compact toroids. Spheromaks and FRC differ in that a spheromak has an extra toroidal field. This toroidal field can run along the same or opposite direction as the spinning plasma. In the spheromak the strength of the toroidal magnetic field is similar to that of the poloidal field. By contrast, the FRC has little to no toroidal field component and is confined solely by a poloidal field. The lack of a toroidal field means that the FRC has no magnetic helicity and that it has a high beta. The high beta makes the FRC attractive as a fusion reactor and well-suited to aneutronic fuels because of the low required magnetic field. Spheromaks have β ≈ 0.1 whereas a typical FRC has β ≈ 1.

Formation 

In modern FRC experiments, the plasma current that reverses the magnetic field can be induced in a variety of ways.

When a field-reversed configuration is formed using the theta-pinch (or inductive electric field) method, a cylindrical coil first produces an axial magnetic field. Then the gas is pre-ionized, which "freezes in" the bias field from a magnetohydrodynamic standpoint, finally the axial field is reversed, hence "field-reversed configuration." At the ends, reconnection of the bias field and the main field occurs, producing closed field lines. The main field is raised further, compressing and heating the plasma and providing a vacuum field between the plasma and the wall.

Neutral beams are known to drive current in Tokamaks by directly injecting charged particles. FRCs can also be formed, sustained, and heated by application of neutral beams. In such experiments, as above, a cylindrical coil produces a uniform axial magnetic field and gas is introduced and ionized, creating a background plasma. Neutral particles are then injected into the plasma. They ionize and the heavier, positively-charged particles form a current ring which reverses the magnetic field.

Spheromaks are FRC-like configurations with finite toroidal magnetic field. FRCs have been formed through the merging of spheromaks of opposite and canceling toroidal field.

Rotating magnetic fields have also been used to drive current. In such experiments, as above, gas is ionized and an axial magnetic field is produced. A rotating magnetic field is produced by external magnetic coils perpendicular to the axis of the machine, and the direction of this field is rotated about the axis. When the rotation frequency is between the ion and electron gyro-frequencies, the electrons in the plasma co-rotate with the magnetic field (are "dragged"), producing current and reversing the magnetic field. More recently, so-called odd parity rotating magnetic fields have been used to preserve the closed topology of the FRC.

Single particle orbits 

FRCs contain an important and uncommon feature: a "magnetic null," or circular line on which the magnetic field is zero. This is necessarily the case, as inside the null the magnetic field points one direction and outside the null the magnetic field points the opposite direction. Particles far from the null trace closed cyclotron orbits as in other magnetic fusion geometries. Particles which cross the null, however, trace not cyclotron or circular orbits but betatron or figure-eight-like orbits, as the orbit's curvature changes direction when it crosses the magnetic null.

Because the particle's orbits are not cyclotron, models of plasma behavior based on cyclotron motion like magnetohydrodynamics (MHD) are inapplicable in the region around the null. The size of this region is related to the s-parameter, or the ratio of the distance between the null and separatrix, and the thermal ion gyroradius. At high-s, most particles do not cross the null and this effect is negligible. At low-s, ~2, this effect dominates and the FRC is said to be "kinetic" rather than "MHD."

Plasma stability

At low s-parameter, most ions inside an FRC follow large betatron orbits (their average gyroradius is about half the size of the plasma) which are typical in accelerator physics rather than plasma physics. These FRCs are very stable because the plasma is not dominated by usual small gyroradius particles like other thermodynamic equilibrium or nonthermal plasmas. Its behavior is not described by classical magnetohydrodynamics, hence there are no Alfvén waves and almost no MHD instabilities despite their theoretical prediction, and it avoids the typical "anomalous transport", i.e. processes in which excess loss of particles or energy occurs.

, several remaining instabilities are being studied:
 The tilt and shift modes. Those instabilities can be mitigated by either including a passive stabilizing conductor, or by forming very oblate plasmas (i.e. very elongated plasmas), or by creating a self-generated toroidal field. The tilt mode has also been stabilized in FRC experiments by increasing the ion gyroradii.
 The magnetorotational instability. This mode causes a rotating elliptical distortion of the plasma boundary, and can destroy the FRC when the distorted plasma comes in contact with the confinement chamber. Successful stabilization methods include the use of a quadrupole stabilizing field, and the effects of a rotating magnetic field (RMF).

Experiments

Spacecraft propulsion
Field-reversed configuration devices have been considered for spacecraft propulsion. By angling the walls of the device outward, the plasmoid can be accelerated in the axial direction and out of the device, generating thrust.

See also
 List of plasma (physics) articles

External links 

 Google techtalks: Nuclear Fusion: Clean Power for the Next Hundred Centuries
 University of Washington " FRC Introduction"

References

Magnetic confinement fusion